The 1952–53 Chicago Black Hawks season was the team's 27th season in the NHL, and they were coming off of two consecutive seasons of finishing in last place in the six team NHL.  The Black Hawks had a record of 17–44–9 in 1951–52, missing the playoffs for the sixth straight season. In 1952–53, the Black Hawks qualified for the playoffs, losing in the first round to the Montreal Canadiens.

Off-season
In the off-season, the Black Hawks and Toronto Maple Leafs completed a trade which sent Harry Lumley to Toronto for Al Rollins, Cal Gardner and Gus Mortson.  Chicago also fired head coach Ebbie Goodfellow, and replaced him with Sid Abel, who would be a player-coach.  Abel would name defenceman Bill Gadsby as the new team captain.

Chicago also saw a change in ownership, as Arthur Wirtz and James D. Norris took over the struggling and near bankrupt franchise.

Regular season
The Black Hawks started the season off strong, sitting with a 10–5–3 record in their first 18 games, however, the club would fall into a slump, and went 2–7–5 in their next 14 games to fall to .500.  Chicago would continue to hover around the .500 for the rest of the season, battling with the Toronto Maple Leafs and Boston Bruins for the final playoff spot.  Going into the final weekend of the season, Chicago would earn big wins against the Detroit Red Wings and New York Rangers to clinch the fourth and final playoff spot, and advance to the playoffs for the first time since 1946.  The Hawks finished with club records in wins with 27, and points with 69.

Offensively, the team was led by Jim McFadden, who scored a team high 23 goals and 44 points, while newly acquired Cal Gardner earned a club best 24 assists, en route to earning 35 points. Jimmy Peters would join McFadden as the only Hawks with over 20 goals and 40 points, as he scored 22 and 41 respectively.  George Gee scored 18 goals and 39 points, while posting a team high 99 penalty minutes.  Team captain Bill Gadsby led the defense with 22 points, while fellow blueliner Al Dewsbury scored 5 goals, and finished with 97 penalty minutes.

In goal, Al Rollins played in all 70 games, setting a team record with 27 victories, along with a solid 2.50 GAA, and 6 shutouts.

Season standings

Record vs. opponents

Playoffs
The Black Hawks would face the second place Montreal Canadiens in a best of seven opening round series.  The Canadiens finished the year with a 28–23–19 record, earning 75 points, which was six more than the Hawks.  The series opened up at the Montreal Forum, and the favored Canadiens won the series opener by a 3–1 score, then took a 2–0 series lead by winning a close second game by a 4–3 score.  The series shifted to Chicago for the next two games, and the Black Hawks would respond, winning the third game in overtime to cut the series lead to 2–1, as the team won their first playoff game since 1944.  The Hawks evened the series up at 2–2 with a 3–1 win in the fourth game, sending the series back to Montreal.  Chicago stunned the Montreal crowd in the fifth game, defeating the Canadiens 4–2 to take a 3–2 series lead.  The Canadiens, though, would shut out Chicago 3–0 in the sixth game, setting up a seventh and final game.  Montreal would easily win the game, defeating the Black Hawks 4–1, putting an end to a very surprising season for the Black Hawks.

Schedule and results

Regular season

Playoffs
Montreal Canadiens 4, Chicago Black Hawks 3

Player statistics

Regular season

Scoring leaders

Goaltending

Playoff

Scoring leaders

Goaltending

Awards and records

The Chicago Black Hawks did not win any NHL awards for the 1952-53 NHL season.

All-Star teams

Transactions
The following is a list of all transactions that have occurred for the Chicago Black Hawks during the 1952–53 NHL season. It lists which team each player has been traded to and for which player(s) or other consideration(s), if applicable.

References

External links
 National Hockey League Guide & Record Book 2007

Chicago Blackhawks seasons
Chicago Black Hawks season, 1952-53
Chicago